Daphne was a naiad (water nymph) in Greek mythology.

Daphne may also refer to:
Daphne (opera), a 1938 opera by Richard Strauss based on the myth and legend of the beautiful nymph Daphne
Daphne (plant), a genus of shrubs in the plant family Thymelaeaceae, noted for their scented flowers and poisonous berries
41 Daphne, an asteroid

Places
Daphne Palace, of Constantinople
Daphni Monastery, near Athens
Daphne Island, a river island in Alberta, Canada
Daphne Major, in the Galápagos Islands
Daphne, Alabama, a city in the United States
A former suburb of the ancient city of Antioch, today Harbiye, Antakya, Turkey
Constantiana Daphne, Byzantine fortification on Danube
Daphne (Mount Athos), Greece, likely site of ancient Cleonae
Daphne (Thrace), a town of ancient Thrace, now in Turkey
Rablah / Riblah, formerly also known by the name Daphne

Vessels
Daphne (brig), a ship that was wrecked in 1819
SS Daphne (1883), a ship which sank disastrously in 1883
HMS Daphne, Royal Navy ships
Princess Daphne, a cruise ship operated by Costa Cruises (1979–1997)
Daphné-class submarine
Daphne-class Seaward Defence Craft, Royal Danish Navy

People
Daphne (singer) (born 1986), Cameroonian singer
Daphne (given name), a list of persons and fictional characters with the given name

Songs 
"Daphne", a song on several Django Reinhardt albums, such as Djangology; written in 1937
"Daphne", a song from the 2002 1 Giant Leap album 1 Giant Leap
"Daphne", a song from the 2011 Lia Ices album Grown Unknown
"Daphne", a song by British band Squeeze from their 1995 album Ridiculous
"Daphne", a song by Bat for Lashes from the album  The Haunted Man
"Daphne", a song from the 2001 John Paul Jones album The Thunderthief

Other uses
Daphne (2017 film), a British drama film
Daphne (2007 film), a British biographical drama film
Daphne (comedy), a British comedy trio
DAPHNE (emulator), an emulator of Laserdisc arcade games
Daphne (Re:Zero), a character in the light novel series Re:Zero − Starting Life in Another World 
Daphne in the Brilliant Blue, a 2004 anime
Détecteur à Grande Acceptance pour la Physique Photonucléaire Expérimentale, a particle detector
DAPHNE project, a European Commission-funded project under FP7 research funding
Daphne Duck, a Disney character
Ethinylestradiol/cyproterone acetate, a birth control pill
Daphne Blake, a Scooby Doo character.

See also
Daffney (born 1975), American professional wrestler
Dafney, surname
Daphnia, small planktonic crustaceans
Plant genus names:
Daphnandra
Daphnidium, synonym of Lindera
Daphniphyllum
Daphnopsis
Dafne (disambiguation)
Dafni (disambiguation)
Dafny (programming language)
Daphne (Amaliada), Greece
Daphne, Alabama metropolitan area
Apollo and Daphne
Compromising Daphne
Daphne Civic Center
Daphne Laureola
Daphne Sounds Expensive
Daphne Walker (disambiguation)